Fruitdale is an unincorporated community in Ross County, in the U.S. state of Ohio.

History
The community was so named on account of fruit orchards near the original site. A post office called Fruitdale was established in 1891, and remained in operation until 1931. Besides the post office, Fruitdale had a train depot on the Ohio Southern Railroad.

References

Unincorporated communities in Ross County, Ohio
Unincorporated communities in Ohio
1891 establishments in Ohio
Populated places established in 1891